Bobovo pri Šmarju ( or ) is a settlement in the hills northeast of Šmarje pri Jelšah in eastern Slovenia. The area is part of the traditional region of Styria. The Municipality of Šmarje pri Jelšah is now included in the Savinja Statistical Region.

Name
The name of the settlement was changed from Bobovo to Bobovo pri Šmarju in 1953.

References

External links
Bobovo pri Šmarju at Geopedia

Populated places in the Municipality of Šmarje pri Jelšah